Conway Downtown Historic District is a national historic district located at Conway in Horry County, South Carolina.  It encompasses the historic commercial and governmental core of the city and includes 32 contributing buildings and one contributing structure. They collectively document the growth and development of Conway from about 1824 to about 1950. The majority of the contributing properties were constructed between about 1900 to about 1940.  Located within the district is the Old Horry County Courthouse and the town clock.  The Art Deco style Holliday Theater was built about 1940.

It was listed on the National Register of Historic Places in 1994 and expanded in 2010.

References

External links

Conway Downtown Historic District Map
Conway Downtown Historic District - Conway, South Carolina - U.S. National Register of Historic Places on Waymarking.com

Historic districts on the National Register of Historic Places in South Carolina
Buildings and structures in Conway, South Carolina
National Register of Historic Places in Horry County, South Carolina